The benthic comb jelly is a comb jelly living in the Ryukyu Trench near Japan.

Description
The benthic comb jelly is a gelatinous organism 5–8 cm wide and 10–20 cm long. It can attach itself to the sea floor using two long filaments and has two retractable tentacles at the opposite end. Its appearance has been said to resemble a two-tailed box kite.

Discovery
The Benthic comb jelly was discovered off the coast of Japan at the Ryukyu Trench. It was observed by the remotely operated underwater vehicle Kaikō on a dive into the Ryukyu Trench in April 2002, but the video and images of this unique bottom dwelling ctenophore remained "undiscovered" until several years later. During April 2006, scientists from the Census of Marine Zooplankton observed a number of rare deep-sea ctenophores, which led to a re-examination of the cydippid ctenophore taxonomy and the suggestion that there be two new families of cydippid ctenophore. Due to several taxonomic affinities, researchers considered this species for inclusion in the genus Aulacoctena. However, it also displayed differences from that genus, so it may need to be placed in a new genus. The specimens were not brought to the surface and in any event, appear fragile and might not withstand the changes of pressure involved.

Diet
Many questions have arisen about the availability of food for the benthic comb jelly. Previously, it was thought the abyssal depths of deep sea trenches, such as this one, could not support predators that actively hunt macroscopic food sources (as opposed to sessile predators, which do not hunt). This led some to believe that there is missing information about the area's ecosystem.

References

Ctenophores
Undescribed animal species